This is a list of the National Register of Historic Places listings in Bexar County, Texas.

This is intended to be a complete list of properties and districts listed on the National Register of Historic Places in Bexar County, Texas. There are 27 districts, 134 individual properties, and one former property listed on the National Register in the county. Two districts and seven individually listed properties are National Historic Landmarks. One district is a National Historical Park, and one property is a National Historic Site. One property is a State Historic Site. Two districts and 15 individually listed properties are State Antiquities Landmarks while six districts contain several more. Two districts are Recorded Texas Historic Landmarks (RTHLs) while 33 individual properties are also designated RTHLs or contain one or more. Ten districts contain many more RTHLs.

Current listings

The publicly disclosed locations of National Register properties and districts may be seen in a mapping service provided.

|}

Former listings

|}

See also

National Register of Historic Places listings in Texas
Recorded Texas Historic Landmarks in Bexar County
San Antonio Downtown and River Walk Historic District

References

External links

Registered Historic Places
Buildings and structures in Bexar County, Texas
 
Bexar